Butyriboletus querciregius is a pored mushroom  in the genus Butyriboletus. Found in California, where it grows in a mycorrhizal association with coast live oak (Quercus agrifolia), it was described as new to science in 2014.

See also
List of North American boletes

References

External links

querciregius
Fungi described in 2014
Fungi of the United States
Fungi without expected TNC conservation status